Walwa (Aboriginal for "a place of waters"), is a town in the Shire of Towong in north east Victoria, Australia. The town is located 1 kilometre from the Murray River on the former Murray Valley highway between Wodonga and Corryong.

Across the river on the New South Wales side are the nearby towns of Jingellic and Tumbarumba.

History
A Post Office first opened on 1 March 1861 and closed in 1865. A Post Office again opened on 1 December 1885, although known as Walwa Creek from 1886 until 1905. Currently, the Walwa Post Office is owned and operated by Belinda Mann, and services the areas of Walwa, Burrowye, Guys Forrest and Sandy Creek.

The First Nations owners of this Country are the "Dhudhuroa" speaking people, whose language was spoken in the Murray River Valley from Albury to around Welaregang and Corryong, and inland along the lower Mitta Mitta River, Tallangatta Creek and parts of the Kiewa Valley.

Walwa Hotel was first built in the 1870s. The original timber hotel was burnt down in the 1930s and rebuilt from locally made bricks.. The "Old Brick Kiln" remains can still be seen on the Eastern side of the township.

The remnants of the Tin Mines are evident on the Western side of Walwa.

Walwa also had a Butter Factory but closed in the 1970s. There was a large dairy industry in the district.

Attractions 
Pine Mountain a few kilometers out of Walwa, located in the Burrowa-Pine Mountain National Park is the largest monolith in the southern hemisphere at 1.5 times the size of Uluru (Ayres Rock).

The town had an Australian rules football team competing in the Upper Murray Football League known as the Border-Walwa Magpies which folded before the 2020 season due to lack of players.

Golfers play at the course of the Walwa Golf Club on Murray River Road.

Walwa also has a Townhall, Walwa Services Memorial Hall. This memorial hall (sometimes named Soldiers' Memorial Hall) commemorates the residents of Walwa who served their country in the First World War and the Second World War.

References

External links 
Towong Shire Council
Walwa Primary School

Gallery

Populated places on the Murray River
Towns in Victoria (Australia)
Shire of Towong